Uriel Weinreich ( Uriel Vaynraykh, ; May 23, 1926 – March 30, 1967) was a Jewish–American linguist.

Life 
Uriel Weinreich was born in Wilno, Poland (since 1945, Vilnius, Lithuania), the first child of Max Weinreich and Regina Szabad, to a family that paternally hailed from Courland in Latvia and maternally came from a well-respected and established Wilno Jewish family. He earned his BA, MA, and PhD from Columbia University and went on to teach there, specializing in Yiddish studies, sociolinguistics, and dialectology. He advocated the increased acceptance of semantics and compiled the iconic Modern English-Yiddish Yiddish-English Dictionary, published shortly after his death.

Weinreich was the son of the linguist Max Weinreich and the mentor of both Marvin Herzog, with whom he laid the groundwork for the Language and Culture Atlas of Ashkenazic Jewry (LCAAJ), and William Labov.  Weinreich is also credited with being the first linguist to recognize the phenomenon of interlanguage 19 years before Larry Selinker coined the term in his 1972 article "Interlanguage".  In his benchmark book Languages in Contact Weinreich first noted that learners of second languages consider linguistic forms from their first language equal to forms in the target language.  However the essential inequality of these forms leads to speech which the native speakers of the target language consider unequal. 

He died of cancer on March 30, 1967, at Montefiore Hospital in New York, prior to the publication of his Yiddish–English dictionary.
Writing about Weinreich in his history of Yiddish Words on fire Dovid Katz said: "Though he lived less than forty-one years, Uriel Weinreich ... managed to facilitate the teaching of Yiddish language at American universities, build a new Yiddish language atlas, and demonstrate the importance of Yiddish for the science of linguistics."

Publications
College Yiddish: An Introduction to the Yiddish Language and to Jewish Life and Culture (YIVO, New York, 1st edition 1949, 6th edition 1999), .
Languages in Contact: Findings and Problems.  New York, 1953.  Reprint, Mouton, The Hague, 1963, .
Say It in Yiddish: A Phrase Book for Travelers (with Beatrice Weinreich).  Dover, New York, 1958, .
Modern english-yidish yidish-english verterbukh. Modern English-Yiddish Yiddish-English Dictionary (McGraw-Hill, New York, 1968 and Schocken, new paperback edition 1987), at Internet Archive https://archive.org/details/modernenglishyid00wein_0/page/n1/mode/2up .

See also
Yiddish language

References

External links

 https://web.archive.org/web/20041029090827/http://www5.bartleby.com/65/we/Weinreic.html
 EYDES (LCAAJ's website)

1926 births
1967 deaths
Linguists from the United States
Linguists of Yiddish
American lexicographers
Linguists from Poland
American people of Polish-Jewish descent
Columbia University faculty
Dialectologists
Sociolinguists
Writers from Vilnius
History of YIVO
20th-century linguists
20th-century lexicographers
Columbia College (New York) alumni
Columbia Graduate School of Arts and Sciences alumni
Columbia University alumni